Antonín Molčík (8 September 1939 - 18 April 2014) was a Czech actor and voice actor.

Molčík died aged 74 in a hospital in Prague.

He voiced character Ennio Salieri in video game Mafia: The City of Lost Heaven (Czech version).

References

1939 births
2014 deaths
20th-century Czech male actors
Czech male actors
Czech male voice actors
Czechoslovak male actors
Czechoslovak male voice actors
Czech male video game actors